Carillo Gritti (12 May 1942 – 9 June 2016) was a Roman Catholic bishop.

Ordained to the priesthood in 1967, Gritti served as bishop of the Territorial Prelature of Itacoatiara, Amazonas, Brazil, from 2000 until his death in 2016.

See also

Notes

1942 births
2016 deaths
21st-century Roman Catholic bishops in Brazil
Roman Catholic bishops of Itacoatiara